The 1976 IPSC Handgun World Shoot II held in Berndorf, Salzburg, Austria was the second IPSC Handgun World Shoot, and was won by Jan Foss of Norway in front of Ray Chapman of United States by a small margin. Foss had been unknown before the championship and did not participate internationally afterwards.

Equipment 
Jan Foss used a 9x19 mm single stack SIG P210 in minor power factor with an 8 round capacity, while Ray Chapman used a 7 round capacity 1911 in major caliber .45 ACP. The Rhodesian teammates Dave Westerhout, Peter Maunder and Dave Arnold were handicapped in that they only had been able to bring two pistols to share, but the night before the championship the sight broke off one of the pistol so all three had to share a single pistol throughout the championship.

Champions
Individual

Teams
The team competition became a sensational competition between Rhodesia and Norway, and in the end only 29 points separated the two. The USA team had been favorites before the championship, but had to settle for third place 185 points behind Rhodesia and 156 points behind Norway.

See also 
IPSC Rifle World Shoots
IPSC Shotgun World Shoot
IPSC Action Air World Shoot

References

 News article in the Norwegian newspaper Aftenposten, 1976 August 8
 Rhodesian Sport Profiles: David Ian Westerhout
 Front Sight Magazine November/ December 2006, page 58 of 84

1976
1975 in shooting sports
Shooting competitions in Austria
1975 in Austrian sport
International sports competitions hosted by Austria